Homann is a surname. Notable people with the surname include:

 Heinrich Homann (1911–1994), East German politician
 Johann Homann (1664–1724), German geographer and cartographer
 Peter Homann (born 1960), Australian Paralympic cyclist
 Theodor Homann (1948–2010), German footballer, -coach and businessman

See also 
 Christian Homann Schweigaard (1838–1899), Norwegian politician
 Homan (disambiguation)
 Hohmann (disambiguation)

German-language surnames